Gasteracantha versicolor, known as the long-winged kite spider, is a species of diurnal spiny orb-weaver of the family Araneidae. It is found in the tropics and sub-tropics, where it occurs in forests. It has an extensive range, from central, east and southern Africa to Madagascar.

The female is 8 to 10 mm long, with a large, glossy and brightly coloured abdomen, like others of their genus. The hardened (sclerotised) abdomen projects over the cephalothorax and has six peripheral spines, with the lateral pair medium to long and slightly recurved in this species. Males are much smaller, less colourful and lack the thorny abdominal projections.

The web has densely spaced radii and an open hub, and may be placed from near ground level to several meters up. Their venom is not known to be dangerous to man.

Races
 G. v. avaratrae Emerit, 1974 – Madagascar 
 G. v. formosa Vinson, 1863 – Madagascar
 G. v. versicolor (Walckenaer, 1841) – mainland Africa

References

versicolor
Spiders described in 1841
Spiders of Africa